Weird Tales (also known as Strange Stories) is a 1994 Italian anthology surreal black comedy film written and directed by Sandro Baldoni.  For this film Baldoni won the Nastro d'Argento for Best New Director.

Cast 
Ivano Marescotti: cittadino, uomo al supermarket, marito famiglia del nord
Silvia Cohen: donna single, moglie famiglia del sud
Mariella Valentini: moglie famiglia del nord
Alfredo Pea: marito famiglia del sud
Stefano Accorsi: trasgressivo

References

External links

1994 films
Italian satirical films
1990s black comedy films
Italian black comedy films
1994 directorial debut films
1994 comedy films
1990s Italian-language films
1990s Italian films